Strontium sulfate (SrSO4) is the sulfate salt of strontium. It is a white crystalline powder and occurs in nature as the mineral celestine. It is poorly soluble in water to the extent of 1 part in 8,800. It is more soluble in dilute HCl and nitric acid and appreciably soluble in alkali chloride solutions (e.g. sodium chloride).

Structure
Strontium sulfate is a polymeric material, isostructural with barium sulfate. Crystallized strontium sulfate is utilized by a small group of radiolarian protozoa, called the Acantharea, as a main constituent of their skeleton.

Applications and chemistry
Strontium sulfate is of interest as a naturally occurring precursor to other strontium compounds, which are more useful.  In industry it is converted to the carbonate for use as ceramic precursor and the nitrate for use in pyrotechnics.

The low aqueous solubility of strontium sulfate can lead to scale formation in processes where these ions meet. For example, it can form on surfaces of equipment in underground oil wells depending on the groundwater conditions.

References

Strontium compounds
Sulfates
Pyrotechnic colorants